Mount Slaggard is the tenth highest peak in Canada and is located in Kluane National Park and Reserve.


See also

List of mountain peaks of North America
List of mountain peaks of Canada

References
 Mt. Slaggard on Bivouac.com
 Mt. Slaggard on SummitPost

External links

Slaggard
Slaggard
Kluane National Park and Reserve